Coper may refer to:

 Hans Coper (1920–1981), German-born British studio potter
 Michael Coper (1946–2019), Australian academic, lawyer, and author
 Coper, Boyacá, town and municipality in the Colombian Department of Boyacá

See also
 Copper (disambiguation)
 Cooper (disambiguation)
 Cope (disambiguation)